Hemidactylus barbierii is a species of gecko, a lizard in the family Gekkonidae. The species is endemic to Kenya.

Etymology
The specific name, barbierii, is in honor of Italian herpetologist Francesco Barbieri (1944–2001).

Geographic range
H. barbierii is found in the area east of Lake Turkana, in northern Kenya.

Habitat
The preferred natural habitat of H. barbierii is savanna.

Description
H. barbierii is medium-sized for its genus. Females are somewhat larger, up to  SVL.

Reproduction
H. barbierii is oviparous.

References

Further reading
Sindaco R, Razzetti E, Ziliani U, Wasonga V, Carugati C, Fasola M (2007). "A new species of Hemidactylus from Lake Turkana, Northern Kenya (Squamata: Gekkonidae)". Acta Herpetologica 2 (1): 37–48. ("Hemidactylus barbierii Sindaco, Razzetti and Ziliani", new species, p. 39). (in English, with an abstract in Italian).
Spawls S, Howell K, Hinkel H, Menegon M (2018). Field Guide to East African Reptiles, Second Edition. London: Bloomsbury Natural History. 624 pp. . (Hemidactylus barbierii, p. 86).

Endemic fauna of Kenya
Hemidactylus
Reptiles described in 2007